The foreign relations of Canada are Canada's relations with other governments and nations. Canada is recognized as a middle power for its role in international affairs with a tendency to pursue multilateral solutions. Canada's foreign policy based on international peacekeeping and security is carried out through coalitions and international organizations, and through the work of numerous federal institutions. Canada's peacekeeping role during the 20th century has played a major role in its global image. The strategy of the Canadian government's foreign aid policy reflects an emphasis to meet the Millennium Development Goals, while also providing assistance in response to foreign humanitarian crises.

Canada's strong attachment to the British Empire led to major participation in British military efforts in the Second Boer War (1899–1902), World War I (1914–1918) and World War II (1939–1945). Since then, Canada has been an advocate for multilateralism, making efforts to resolve global issues in collaboration with other nations. During the Cold War, Canada was a major contributor to UN forces in the Korean War and founded the North American Aerospace Defense Command (NORAD) in cooperation with the United States to defend against potential aerial attacks from the Soviet Union.

Canada and the United States share the world's longest undefended border, co-operate on military campaigns and exercises, and are each other's largest trading partner. Canada nevertheless has an independent foreign policy. For example, it maintains full relations with Cuba and declined to participate in the Vietnam War and the 2003 invasion of Iraq. Canada is noted for having a positive relationship with the Netherlands, owing, in part, to its contribution to the Dutch liberation during World War II.

Canada was a founding member of the United Nations and has membership in the World Trade Organization, the G20 and the Organisation for Economic Co-operation and Development (OECD). Canada is also a member of various other international and regional organizations and forums for economic and cultural affairs. Canada acceded to the International Covenant on Civil and Political Rights in 1976. Canada joined the Organization of American States (OAS) in 1990 and hosted the OAS General Assembly in 2000 and the 3rd Summit of the Americas in 2001. Canada seeks to expand its ties to Pacific Rim economies through membership in the Asia-Pacific Economic Cooperation forum (APEC).

History

Administration
In 1982, responsibility for trade was added with the creation of the Department of External Affairs and International Trade. In 1995, the name was changed to Department of Foreign Affairs and International Trade.

Canada has often carried out its foreign policy through coalitions and international organizations, and through the work of numerous federal institutions. Under the aegis of Canadian foreign policy, various departments and agencies conduct their own international relations and outreach activities. For example, the Canadian Forces and the Department of National Defence conduct defence diplomacy in support of national interests, including through the deployment of Canadian Defence Attachés, participation in bilateral and multilateral military forums (e.g., the System of Cooperation Among the American Air Forces), ship and aircraft visits, military training and cooperation, and other such outreach and relationship-building efforts.

There are two major elements of Canadian foreign relations, Canada-US relations and multilateralism.

Greg Donaghy, of Canada's Department of Foreign Affairs, argues:
Since taking power in 2006, Prime Minister Harper's government has clearly abandoned the liberal internationalism that had so often characterized Ottawa's approach to world affairs, replacing it with a new emphasis on realist notions of national interest, enhanced capabilities, and Western democratic values.

In August of 2022, a six-part documentary series titled, Truth to the Powerless: An Investigation into Canada's Foreign Policy, was released online to the general public to watch for free. The docuseries explored the role that Canada's foreign policy has played in the international arena and the docuseries features interviews with numerous Canadian politicians, academics, diplomats, and activists. 

Canada's international relations are the responsibility of the Department of Global Affairs, which is run by the Minister of Foreign Affairs, a position currently held by François-Philippe Champagne.  Traditionally the Prime Minister has played a prominent role in foreign affairs decisions.  Foreign aid, formerly delivered through the Canadian International Development Agency, has been administered by DFATD since March 2013.

Foreign aid

Canada's foreign aid was administered by the Canadian International Development Agency, which provided aid and assistance to other countries around the world through various methods. In March 2013 CIDA ceased to exist when it was folded into DFAIT, creating DFATD. The strategy of the Canadian government's foreign aid policy reflects an emphasis to meet the Millennium Development Goals, while also providing assistance in response to foreign humanitarian crises. However a growing focus on development, defence, and diplomacy in recent decades has produced a concentration of foreign aid funding to countries determined to be security risks to Canadian policy. For example, in 2004–2005 the largest recipients of Canada's official developmental assistance were Afghanistan and Iraq, two nations in conflict with the United States of America and its allies at the time. The structural emphasis on security and industry development has contributed to a fixed foreign policy that generally fails to consider global health and international social and economic inequalities. According to the OECD, 2019 official development assistance from Canada increased 0.5% to US$4.7 billion.

In addition, although Canada's foreign aid policies has been moulded with the intentions to be in accordance to the Millennium Development Goals, its focus on human security has slowly shifted away as new policy developments arose. The foreign aid provided by the country became less "people-centered" and less health-related. Canada's contributions have been quite inconsistent with regards to human security, which indicates that the reputation that the country has built throughout the years, in fact, exceeds the country's actual record. Canada's contributions internationally have been detrimental and crucial but it needs redirecting back to its original goals.

Federalism and foreign relations
The provinces have a high level of freedom to operate internationally, dating from Quebec's first representative to France in 1886, Hector Fabre.  Alberta has had representatives abroad, starting with Alberta House in London (37 Hill Street), since 1948, and British Columbia around 25 years before that. By 1984, Quebec had offices in ten countries including eight in the United States and three in other Canadian provinces while Ontario had thirteen delegations in seven countries. Most provincial governments have a ministry of international relations, both Quebec and New Brunswick are members of La Francophonie (separately from the federal delegation), Alberta has quasi-diplomatic offices in Washington (currently staffed by former cabinet minister Gary Mar).  Provincial premiers were always part of the famous Team Canada trade missions of the 1990s.  In 2007, Quebec premier Jean Charest proposed a free trade agreement with the European Union.

Provinces have always participated in some foreign relations, and appointed agents general in the United Kingdom and France for many years, but they cannot legislate treaties. The French-speaking provinces of Quebec and New Brunswick are members of la Francophonie, and Ontario has announced it wishes to join. Quebec has pursued its own foreign relations, especially with France. Alberta opened an office in Washington, D.C., in March 2005 to lobby the American government, mostly to reopen the borders to import of Canadian beef. With the exception of Quebec, none of these efforts undermine the ability of the federal government to conduct foreign affairs.

Bilateral relations

Africa

Americas

Asia

Europe

Oceania

Other bilateral and plurilateral relations
One important difference between Canadian and American foreign policy has been in relations with communist governments. Canada established diplomatic relations with the People's Republic of China (13 October 1970) long before the Americans did (1 January 1979). It also has maintained trade and diplomatic relations with communist Cuba, despite pressures from the United States.

Arms Control

Canadian Government guidance for export controls on weapons systems is published by Foreign Affairs and International Trade Canada. Automatic Firearms Country Control List, comprises a list of approved export nations which include as of 2014; (Albania, Australia, Belgium, Botswana, Bulgaria, Colombia, Croatia, Czech Republic, Denmark, Estonia, Finland, France, Germany, Greece, Hungary, Iceland, Italy, Latvia, Lithuania, Luxembourg, Netherlands, New Zealand, Norway, Poland, Portugal, Romania, Saudi Arabia, Slovakia, Slovenia, Spain, Sweden, Turkey, United Kingdom, and the United States).

Selected dates of diplomatic representation abroad
Australia – 1939 – first high commissioner Charles Burchell
Belgium – January 1939 – first ambassador Jean Désy
China – 1943 – first ambassador General Victor Odlum
France – 1882 – agent without diplomatic status Hector Fabre
France – 1928 – first minister Philippe Roy
France – 1944 – first ambassador George Philias Vanier
International Criminal Court – 2003 – first Judge-President Philippe Kirsch
Japan – May 1929 – first minister Sir Herbert Marler
Mexico – January 1944 – first ambassador William Ferdinand Alphonse Turgeon
Netherlands – January 1939 – first ambassador Jean Désy
Newfoundland – 1941 – first high commissioner Charles Burchell
United Kingdom – 1880 – first high commissioner Sir Alexander Galt
United Nations – first ambassador General Andrew McNaughton
United States of America – 1926 – first minister Vincent Massey

Multilateralism

Canada is and has been a strong supporter of multilateralism. The country is one of the world's leading peacekeepers, sending soldiers under the U.N. authority around the world. Canadian former Minister of Foreign Affairs and subsequent Prime Minister, Lester B. Pearson, is credited for his contributions to modern international peacekeeping, for which he won the Nobel Peace Prize in 1957. Canada is committed to disarmament, and is especially noted for its leadership in the 1997 Convention in Ottawa on the prohibition of the use, stockpiling, production and transfer of anti-personnel mines.

In the last century Canada has made efforts to reach out to the rest of the world and promoting itself as a "middle power" able to work with large and small nations alike. This was demonstrated during the Suez Crisis when Lester B. Pearson mollified the tension by proposing peacekeeping efforts and the inception of the United Nations Peacekeeping Force. In that spirit, Canada developed and has tried to maintain a leading role in UN peacekeeping efforts.

Canada has long been reluctant to participate in military operations that are not sanctioned by the United Nations, such as the Vietnam War or the 2003 Invasion of Iraq, but does join in sanctioned operations such as the first Gulf War, Afghanistan and Libya.  It participated with its NATO and OAS allies in the Kosovo Conflict and in Haiti respectively.

Despite Canada's track record as a liberal democracy that has embraced the values of the UN's Universal Declaration of Human Rights, Canada has not been involved in any major plan for Reform of the United Nations Security Council; although the Canadian government does support UN reform, in order to strengthen UN efficiency and effectiveness.

Canada hosted the third Summit of the Americas in Quebec City.

Canada is working on setting up military bases around the world, while reducing aid and diplomatic efforts. In the late 90s, Canada actively promoted the notion of human security as an alternative to business-as-usual approaches to foreign aid. However, by invoking the "three Ds" (defense, diplomacy, and development) as the fundamental basis for Canadian foreign policy, and then implementing this in a manner that conforms more to military security and trade interests, Canada has successfully distanced itself from the humanitarian objectives of foreign aid, with the human security goal far from being achieved.  Under the Harper government, emphasis on promoting Canada's military presence internationally has included an effort to rebrand Canada historically as a "warrior nation", in large measure to counter the image of only supporting peacekeeping and multilateralism.

Canada’s relations within the Americas
Canada joined the Organization of American States (OAS) in 1990 and has been an active member, hosting the OAS General Assembly in Windsor, Ontario, in June 2000.

Canada–Caribbean relations 

Many Caribbean Community countries turn to Canada as a valued partner. Canadians, particularly Canadian banks and utility companies play an important economic role in the development of former British West Indies colonies. Efforts to improve trade have included the idea of concluding a free trade agreement to replace the 1986 bilateral CARIBCAN agreement. At various times, several Caribbean countries have also considered joining Canadian Confederation as new provinces or territories, although no Caribbean nation has implemented such a proposal. Note that many Caribbean countries are also involved in the Commonwealth of Nations, below.

Canada–Latin American relations 

In recent years Canadian leaders have taken increasing interest in Latin America. Canada has had diplomatic relations with Venezuela since January 1953 and the relations are based on mutual commercial interests, especially in technology, oil and gas industry, telecommunications and others.  Canada has an ongoing trade dispute with Brazil.

Canada–Asia relations 

In 1985 the Parliament of Canada passed an Act to create the Asia Pacific Foundation of Canada, a think-tank focusing on Canada-Asia relations, in order to enhance Canada-Asia relations. Canada also seeks to expand its ties to Pacific Rim economies through membership in the Asia-Pacific Economic Cooperation forum (APEC).

Canada–Commonwealth of Nations 

Canada maintains close links to the United Kingdom and other Commonwealth realms, with which Canada has strong historic ties and shares a monarch. It also remains a member of the Commonwealth.

Canada–Europe and Canada–European Union relations
Canada is an active participant in discussions stemming from the Organization for Security and Cooperation in Europe (OSCE).

International organizations

Canada is a member of the following organizations:

Asian Development Bank (ADB) (nonregional member)
African Development Bank (AfDB) (nonregional member)
Asia-Pacific Economic Cooperation (APEC)
Arctic Council
ASEAN Regional Forum (ARF)
Association of Caribbean States (ACS) (observer and partner)
Association of Southeast Asian Nations (ASEAN) (dialogue partner)
Australia Group
Bank for International Settlements (BIS)
Caribbean Development Bank (CDB) (nonregional member)
Caribbean Postal Union (CPU)
Commonwealth of Nations
Euro-Atlantic Partnership Council (EAPC)
European Bank for Reconstruction and Development (EBRD)
Food and Agriculture Organization (FAO)
Financial Action Task Force (FATF)
Group of Seven (G7) –
Group of Eight (G8)
Group of Ten (G-10)
Group of Twenty (G-20)
Inter-American Development Bank (IADB)
International Atomic Energy Agency (IAEA)
International Bank for Reconstruction and Development (IBRD) (also known as the World Bank)
International Civil Aviation Organization (ICAO)
International Chamber of Commerce (ICC)
International Criminal Court (ICCt)
International Red Cross and Red Crescent Movement (ICRM)
International Development Association (IDA)
International Energy Agency (IEA)
International Fund for Agricultural Development (IFAD)
International Finance Corporation (IFC)
International Federation of Red Cross and Red Crescent Societies (IFRCS)
International Hydrographic Organization (IHO)
International Labour Organization (ILO)
International Monetary Fund (IMF)
International Maritime Organization (IMO)
International Mobile Satellite Organization (IMSO)
Interpol (organization) (Interpol)
International Olympic Committee (IOC)
International Organization for Migration (IOM)
Inter-Parliamentary Union (IPU)
International Organization for Standardization (ISO)
International Telecommunications Satellite Organization (ITSO)
International Telecommunication Union (ITU)
International Trade Union Confederation (ITUC)
Multilateral Investment Guarantee Agency (MIGA)
MINUSTAH (United Nations Stabilization Mission in Haiti)
MONUSCO (United Nations Organization Stabilization Mission in the Democratic Republic of the Congo)
North American Free Trade Agreement (NAFTA)
North Atlantic Treaty Organization (NATO)
Nuclear Energy Agency (NEA)
Nuclear Suppliers Group (NSG)
Organization of American States (OAS)
Organisation for Economic Co-operation and Development (OECD)
Organisation internationale de la Francophonie, International Organisation of La Francophonie (OIF)
Organisation for the Prohibition of Chemical Weapons (OPCW)
Organization for Security and Cooperation in Europe (OSCE)
Paris Club
ParlAmericas
Permanent Court of Arbitration (PCA)
Pacific Islands Forum (PIF) (partner)
Postal Union of the Americas, Spain and Portugal
Southeast European Cooperative Initiative (SECI) (observer)
United Nations (UN)
United Nations–African Union Mission in Darfur (UNAMID)
United Nations Conference on Trade and Development (UNCTAD)
United Nations Disengagement Observer Force (UNDOF)
United Nations Educational, Scientific and Cultural Organization (UNESCO)
United Nations Peacekeeping Force in Cyprus (UNFICYP)
United Nations High Commissioner for Refugees (UNHCR)
United Nations Mission in the Sudan (UNMIS)
United Nations Relief and Works Agency for Palestine Refugees in the Near East (UNRWA)
United Nations Truce Supervision Organization (UNTSO)
World Tourism Organization (UNWTO)
Universal Postal Union (UPU)
World Customs Organization (WCO)
World Federation of Trade Unions (WFTU)
World Health Organization (WHO)
World Intellectual Property Organization (WIPO)
World Meteorological Organization (WMO)
World Trade Organization (WTO)
Zangger Committee

Relations with international groups

Organizations with headquarters in Canada
International Air Transport Association
 International Civil Aviation Organization
Northwest Atlantic Fisheries Organization
North Pacific Anadromous Fish Commission
United Nations Association in Canada

Major treaties signed in Canada
Ottawa Treaty or Mine Ban Treaty (1997)
Montreal Protocol on Substances That Deplete the Ozone Layer (1987)
Great Peace of Montreal (1701)

Territorial and boundary disputes

Canada and the United States have negotiated the boundary between the countries over many years, with the last significant agreement having taken place in 1984 when the International Court of Justice ruled on the maritime boundary in the Gulf of Maine.  Likewise, Canada and France had previously contested the maritime boundary surrounding the islands of St. Pierre and Miquelon, but accepted a 1992 International Court of Arbitration ruling.

Remaining disputes include managed maritime boundary disputes with the US (Dixon Entrance, Beaufort Sea, Strait of Juan de Fuca, Machias Seal Island).

Arctic disputes

A long-simmering dispute between Canada and the U.S. involves the issue of Canadian sovereignty over the Northwest Passage (the sea passages in the Arctic). Canada's assertion that the Northwest Passage represents internal (territorial) waters has been challenged by other countries, especially the U.S., which argue that these waters constitute an international strait (international waters). Canadians were incensed when Americans drove the reinforced oil tanker Manhattan through the Northwest Passage in 1969, followed by the icebreaker Polar Sea in 1985, both without asking for Canadian permission.  In 1970, the Canadian government enacted the Arctic Waters Pollution Prevention Act, which asserts Canadian regulatory control over pollution within a  zone.  In response, the Americans in 1970 stated, "We cannot accept the assertion of a Canadian claim that the Arctic waters are internal waters of Canada.... Such acceptance would jeopardize the freedom of navigation essential for United States naval activities worldwide." A compromise was reached in 1988, by an agreement on "Arctic Cooperation," which pledges that voyages of American icebreakers "will be undertaken with the consent of the Government of Canada."  However the agreement did not alter either country's basic legal position.  Essentially, the Americans agreed to ask for the consent of the Government of Canada without conceding that they were obliged to.  In January 2006, David Wilkins, the American ambassador to Canada, said his government opposes Stephen Harper's proposed plan to deploy military icebreakers in the Arctic to detect interlopers and assert Canadian sovereignty over those waters.

Along with other nations in the Arctic Council, Canada, Sweden, Iceland, Norway, Finland, Denmark and Russia, the maritime boundaries in the far north will be decided after countries have completed their submissions, due in 2012. Russia has made an extensive claim based on the Russian position that everything that is an extension of the Lomonosov Ridge should be assigned to Russia. Their submission had been rejected when first submitted by the United Nations in 2001. The regions represent some of the most extreme environments on Earth yet there is a hope for hypothetically commercially viable oil and gas deposits.

In June 2019, the U.S. State Department spokesperson Morgan Ortagus said the US "view Canada’s claim that the waters of the Northwest Passage are internal waters of Canada as inconsistent with international law."

See also
Alberta International and Intergovernmental Relations
Canada and the Iraq War
Canada and the Vietnam War
Canada–NATO relations
Canada and the United Nations
Defence Diplomacy
Department of Intergovernmental Affairs (New Brunswick)
Diplomatic Forum
List of Canadian Ministers of Foreign Affairs
List of Canadian Ministers for International Cooperation
List of Canadian Ministers of International Trade
List of Canadian Secretaries of State for External Affairs
List of diplomatic missions in Canada
List of diplomatic missions of Canada
List of state and official visits by Canada
Ministry of International Relations (Quebec)
Visa requirements for Canadian citizens

References

Further reading

 Murray, Robert W. and Paul Gecelovsky, eds.  The Palgrave Handbook of Canada in International Affairs (Palgrave Macmillan, Cham, 2021) online

 Bothwell, Robert. Canada and the United States (1992) online
 Bothwell, Robert. The big chill: Canada and the Cold War (1998) online
 Bothwell, Robert. Alliance and illusion : Canada and the world, 1945-1984 (2007) online
 Bothwell, Robert and Jean Daudelin eds. Canada Among Nations: 100 Years of Canadian Foreign Policy (2009)
 Boucher, Jean-Christophe. "Yearning for a progressive research program in Canadian foreign policy." International Journal 69.2 (2014): 213–228. online commentary H-DIPLO
 Bouka, Yolande, et al. "Is Canada's Foreign Policy Really Feminist? Analysis and Recommendations." Policy 13 (2021). online
 Bow, Brian, and Andrea Lane, eds. Canadian Foreign Policy: Reflections on a Field in Transition (2020) excerpt

 Bugailiskis, Alex, and Andrés Rozental, eds. Canada Among Nations, 2011-2012: Canada and Mexico's Unfinished Agenda (2012) further details

 Carnaghan, Matthew, Allison Goody, "Canadian Arctic Sovereignty" (Library of Parliament: Political and Social Affairs Division, 26 January 2006)
 Chapnick, Adam, and Christopher J. Kukucha, eds. The Harper Era in Canadian Foreign Policy: Parliament, Politics, and Canada’s Global Posture (UBC Press, 2016).
 Collins, Jeffrey F. "Defence Procurement and Canadian Foreign Policy." in The Palgrave Handbook of Canada in International Affairs (Palgrave Macmillan, Cham, 2021) pp. 275-295.
 Congressional Research Service. Canada-U.S. Relations (Congressional Research Service, 2021) 2021 Report, by an agency of the U.S. government; not copyright; Updated February 10, 2021.
 Eayrs, James. In Defence of Canada. (5 vols. University of Toronto Press, 1964–1983) the standard history
 Fox, Annette Baker. Canada in World Affairs (Michigan State University Press, 1996)
 
 Glazov, Jamie. Canadian Policy Toward Khrushchev's Soviet Union (2003).
 Granatstein, J. L., ed. Canadian foreign policy : historical readings (1986), excerpts from primary sources and scholars online free

 Hampson, Fen Osler, and James A. Baker. Master of Persuasion: Brian Mulroney's Global Legacy (2018)
 Hawes, Michael K., and Christopher John Kirkey, eds. Canadian Foreign Policy in a Unipolar World (Oxford UP, 2017).
 Hillmer, Norman and Philippe Lagassé. Justin Trudeau and Canadian Foreign Policy: Canada Among Nations 2017 (2018)
 Holmes John W. The Shaping of Peace: Canada and the Search for World Order. (2 vols. University of Toronto Press, 1979, 1982)

 James, Patrick, Nelson Michaud, and Marc O'Reilly, eds. Handbook of Canadian foreign policy (Lexington Books, 2006), essays by experts; 610pp  excerpt
 James, Patrick. Canada and Conflict (Oxford University Press, 2012) H-DIPLO online reviews June 2014
 Kirk, John M. and Peter McKenna; Canada-Cuba Relations: The Other Good Neighbor Policy UP of Florida (1997).
 Kirton, John and Don Munton, eds. Cases and Readings in Canadian Foreign Policy Since World War II (1992) 24 episodes discussed by experts
 Kukucha, Christopher J. "Neither adapting nor innovating: the limited transformation of Canadian foreign trade policy since 1984." Canadian Foreign Policy Journal (2018): 1–15.
 McCormick, James M. "Pivoting toward Asia: Comparing the Canadian and American Policy Shifts." American Review of Canadian Studies 46.4 (2016): 474–495.
 McCullough, Colin, and Robert Teigrob, eds. Canada and the United Nations: Legacies, Limits, Prospects (2017).
 Melnyk, George.  Canada and the New American Empire: War and Anti-War University of Calgary Press, 2004, highly critical 
 Michaud, Nelson. "Balancing Interests and Constraints: The Role of Provinces in the Shaping of Canadian Foreign Policy." in Political Turmoil in a Tumultuous World (Palgrave Macmillan, Cham, 2021) pp. 77-104.

 Miller, Ronnie. Following the Americans to the Persian Gulf: Canada, Australia, and the Development of the New World Order (Fairleigh Dickinson University Press, 1994)
 Molot, Maureen Appel. "Where Do We, Should We, Or Can We Sit? A Review of the Canadian Foreign Policy Literature", International Journal of Canadian Studies (Spring-Fall 1990) 1#2 pp 77–96.
 Nossal, Kim Richard et al. International Policy and Politics in Canada (2010), university textbook; online 1989 edition
 Paris, Roland. "Are Canadians still liberal internationalists? Foreign policy and public opinion in the Harper era." International Journal 69.3 (2014): 274–307. online
 Rochlin, James. Discovering the Americas: The Evolution of Canadian Foreign Policy towards Latin America (University of British Columbia Press, 1994)
 Sarty, Keigh. “The Fragile Authoritarians: China, Russia and Canadian Foreign Policy.”  International Journal 75:4 (December 2020):  614–628.  DOI: The fragile authoritarians: China, Russia, and Canadian foreign policy. online review
 Stacey, C. P.  Canada and the Age of Conflict: Volume 1: 1867–1921 (1979), a standard scholarly history 
 Stacey, C. P. Canada and the Age of Conflict, 1921–1948. Vol. 2. (University of Toronto Press, 1981), a standard scholarly history; online
 Stairs Denis, and Gilbert R. Winham, eds. The Politics of Canada's Economic Relationship with the United States (University of Toronto Press, 1985)
 Stevenson, Brian J. R. Canada, Latin America, and the New Internationalism: A Foreign Policy Analysis, 1968–1990 (2000)

 Tiessen, Rebecca, and Heather A. Smith. "Canada’s ‘Feminist’ Foreign Policy Under the Harper Conservatives (2006–2015) and Trudeau Liberals (2015–2019) in Global Perspective." in The Palgrave Handbook of Canada in International Affairs (Palgrave Macmillan, Cham, 2021) pp. 117-139.
 Wildeman, Jeremy. "Assessing Canada’s foreign policy approach to the Palestinians and Israeli-Palestinian peacebuilding, 1979–2019." Canadian Foreign Policy Journal 27.1 (2021): 62-80. online

 Wildeman, Jeremy. "The Middle East in Canadian foreign policy and national identity formation." International Journal 76.3 (2021): 359-383. online

 Wilson, Robert R. and David R. Deener; Canada-United States Treaty Relations (Duke University Press, 1963)

Primary Sources

 Riddell, Walter A. ed. Documents on Canadian Foreign Policy, 1917–1939 Oxford University Press, 1962 806 pages of documents

External links
 Foreign Affairs Canada – Heads of Posts List 
 Embassy: Canada's Foreign Policy Newsweekly
 Canada's place in world affairs
 Foreign Affairs Canada – Canada and the World: A History  a history of Canadian foreign policy.
 Foreign Affairs Canada – Country and Regional Information a summary of Canada's relations with each foreign government as well as some international regions and organizations
 Canada at the Group of 8
 "H-Diplo Roundtable on Patrick James.  Canada and Conflict" (June 2014)
 Global Affairs Canada Treaties ruling relations Argentina and Canada
 Canadian Encyclopedia entry on Globalization
 Global Affairs Canada  Canadian Foreign Affairs and International Trade Office about relations with Argentina

 
Canada and the Commonwealth of Nations